The Isle of the Dead is a concept from pre-Christian Europe of an island to the west where souls went after death. It is reported as being part of Celtic belief by several Roman historians, and evidence for this belief is also found in Welsh folklore. It also existed in ancient Germanic traditions where the British Isles were sometimes depicted as the isles to the west that the dead inhabited.

References

Locations in Celtic mythology
Mythological islands

Afterlife places